Provincial Highway 84 is an expressway, which begins in Beimen, Tainan on the Provincial Highway No. 61 and ends in Yujing, Tainan on Zhongshan Road (Provincial Highway No. 20).

History
The route between Beimen, Tainan and Syuejia, Tainan is under construction and will be completed in 2014.

A short section in Beimen, Tainan between National Highway No. 61 and Provincial Highway No. 17 was open in 2004. It functions as a feeder to National Highway No. 61.

Length
The total length is 41.428 km.

Exit list
The entire route is within Tainan City.

{| class="plainrowheaders wikitable"
|-
!scope=col|City
!scope=col|Location
!scope=col|km
!scope=col|Mile
!scope=col|Exit
!scope=col|Name
!scope=col|Destinations
!scope=col|Notes
|-

Intersections
National Highway No. 3 at Guantian JCT. in Guantian, Tainan
National Highway No. 1 at Xiaying JCT. in Xiaying, Tainan
Provincial Highway No. 61 at Beimen IC. in Beimen, Tainan(under construction)

See also
 Highway system in Taiwan

References

External links
http://www.thb.gov.tw/

Highways in Taiwan